Stade Am Deich is a football stadium in Ettelbruck, in central Luxembourg.  It is currently the home stadium of FC Etzella Ettelbruck.  The stadium has a capacity of about 2,020.

References
FC ETZELLA - Website

Deich
Ettelbruck